Kentucky Route 34 (KY 34) is a , east–west, 2-lane, state highway in Kentucky managed by the Kentucky Transportation Cabinet.

KY 34 begins at US 68 and KY 52 near Mitchellsburg and goes through Boyle and Garrard counties before terminating at Lexington Road (Old US 27) east of Danville just beyond US 27. KY 34 formerly terminated at US 27 before US 27 was rebuilt to the west.  It serves as a primary connector between Danville and Lexington.

Major intersections

Alternate names
KY 34 has other names along its path:
Lebanon Road from its western terminus into Danville.
Main Street (US 150 and US 127) in Danville
Wilderness Road in Danville
Lexington Road from Danville to the Garrard County line
Chenault Bridge Road in Garrard County

Future

A new route (KY 2168) is planned to connect KY 34 and KY 33 northeast of Danville.

References

External links
 Kentucky Roads - KY 34
 State Primary Road System in Boyle County
 State Primary Road System in Garrard County

0034